Road bowling (also called [long] bullets) is an Irish  sport in which competitors attempt to take the fewest throws to propel a metal ball along a predetermined course of country roads. The sport originated in Ireland and is mainly played in counties Armagh and Cork. Road bowling in Ireland is governed by the voluntary Irish Road Bowling Association.

A similar sport, Klootschieten, is played in eastern parts of the Netherlands and in northern Germany.

Rules and playing style 
The "bullet" or "bowl" is a solid iron cannonball of c. circumference and  weight. There are two or more players or teams in a match or "score". The one with the fewest shots to the finish line wins. If two players or teams approach the finish line with equal shots, the winner is decided by which throw goes farther past the finish line.

A road shower advises the thrower about the throw (or shot) much like a golf caddy, while another helper stands ahead of the thrower, feet apart, to show the best line or path in the road.

The thrower runs to the throwing mark and, in the Northern or County Armagh style, extends the arm and bowl behind him as he runs. At the throwing mark the arm is snapped forward by arching the back and shoulders, releasing the bowl underhand before stepping over the mark.

In the Southern or County Cork style, as the thrower runs to the mark the arm and bowl are lifted up and back, then whirled downward into an underhand throw, releasing the bowl before stepping over the mark.

Wherever the bowl stops (not where it leaves the road surface), a chalk mark is made at the nearest point on the road and the next throw is taken from behind that mark. In Armagh, the mark is usually made by pulling a tuft of grass and dropping it on the road. 

Over tight curves, or corners where two roads meet, the bowl may be thrown through the air (lofted). The loft must strike the road or pass over it. If the loft fails to reach the road, it counts as one shot, and the next throw must be taken again from the same mark.

Spectators sometimes bet on the outcome and proffer advice to their favoured competitor in the course of a match.

History
Fintan Lane, in his book Long Bullets: A History of Road Bowling in Ireland, traces the sport to at least the 17th century and suggests that it was once far more widespread than it is today. While some sources state that it is an "indigenous [Irish] sport", other sources suggest that it may have been brought to Ireland by Dutch troops during the Williamite War in Ireland (1689-1691). Until the 19th century, the game was also played in Scotland, the north of England and in North America. 

In the past, players were given twenty shots (a score) each, the winner determined by who went the greatest distance. Though the modern game is a fixed distance in fewest shots, the expression "score" for a match survives. Disputes between competitors or spectators sometimes created public disturbance and court cases resulted as recently as the 1950s.

Ból Chumann na hÉireann was formed in 1954 to replace the less organised All-Ireland Bowl Players Association. There were irregular contests between Cork and Armagh champions over the decades, but the first national championship between them was in 1963. The first World Championship was as part of Cork 800 in 1985.

As part of the response to the COVID-19 pandemic in Ireland, Ból Chumann na hÉireann sanctioned a "temporary ban on the sport". The 2020 All-Ireland road bowling championships were rescheduled to late 2020.

Geography

The Irish form of road bowling is concentrated in counties Cork and Armagh (especially south Armagh). The 2015 All-Ireland Series took place in County Cork with the 2016 event planned for Madden, County Armagh.

The sport is also played in Mayo (Castlebar), Limerick, Waterford, Louth, Monaghan and later in Tyrone and Wexford and also in Dagenham, London, UK.

The Irish game also has players in Boston, Massachusetts; Cambridge, New York, and Bennington, Vermont, vicinity; Indian Lake, New York, Syracuse, New York; Traverse City, Michigan; Asheville, North Carolina; Savannah, Georgia; and Kansas City, Kansas. The sport is also growing in the fairs and festivals of the state of West Virginia. One of the world's largest Irish road bowling events is held annually in September in Wheeling, West Virginia, where it is hosted by a local division of the Ancient Order of Hibernians. In Canada, a contest was held in Colborne, Canada during May 2007.

Klootschieten is a similar game played in the Netherlands and northwest Germany, including in Friesland and Schleswig-Holstein, and international events have been staged between these regions and Ireland.

Terminology 
The winners of the men's and women's All-Ireland competitions are referred to as the "King of the Roads" and "Queen of the Roads" respectively. Other game terminology, as used primarily in Ireland, includes:   
bowl of odds when one bowler is one full shot fewer than their opponent, i.e., when a bowler is equal to or farther in distance than their opponent, but has thrown one less shot.
break butt  To step over the butt before releasing the bowl
bullet the bowl that is thrown or "shot"
bullets County Armagh name for the game of road bowling. Also long bullets. See also bullet.
butt the throwing mark on the road. See also break butt
corner a sharp curve in the road or a corner where two roads meet. See also open the corner
fág a' bealach! anglicised as Faugh A Ballagh and meaning "clear the way" (to warn spectators on the road in front of the thrower)
get sight see open the corner
kitter-pawa left-handed thrower (from )
loftto throw through the air.
long bullets see bullets
open the corner also get sight. to throw so deeply into the curve that the next throw is a straight shot out.
score a match
shot a throw
sopa tuft of grass placed in the road at a spot where the bowl should first strike the surface. An experienced bowler can "split the sop".
stylish bowlera bowler with a smooth well-coordinated delivery.

In popular culture
The song Out the Road by Gaelic Storm is about a road bowling score. Additionally, footage of a road bowling score is included in a YouTube video shot by band founders Pat Murphy and Steve Twigger about their trip to Murphy's native County Cork during the production of their album Chicken Boxer (which includes Out the Road).

Notable bowlers
 Mick Barry (1919–2014) of Cork was All-Ireland Champion on eight occasions between 1965 and 1975. A road was named after him in 2010.
 John Buckley (b.1939), former Roman Catholic bishop of Cork and Ross, was "still bowl[ing] at the age of 75".

References

External links
 Irish Road Bowling Association website
 West Virginia Irish Road Bowling Association website
 IrishAroundTheWorld.com - What is Irish Road Bowling and the history behind it

 
Bowling
Bowling in Ireland
Road bowling